Alf Hellevik (28 June 1909 – 8 November 2001) was a Norwegian philologist.

He was born in Fjaler. He graduated as cand.philol. from the University of Oslo in 1938. He was the principal editor of the multi-volume dictionary Norsk Ordbok from 1948 to 1978. He lectured at the University of Oslo from 1972 until his retirement in 1977. He edited several editions of Nynorsk Ordliste. From 1952 to 1970 he was a member of Norsk Språknemnd, and a member of the Norwegian Language Council from 1972 to 1988.

He resided at Hosle during his working career, but later moved back to Sunnfjord. He died in November 2001 in Askvoll.

See also
Spynorsk mordliste

References

1909 births
2001 deaths
People from Fjaler
Norwegian philologists
Academic staff of the University of Oslo
Nynorsk-language writers
20th-century philologists